Wheatland is a neighborhood located on State Highway 152 in southwestern Oklahoma City, Oklahoma, United States. The post office opened February 10, 1902. That same year, the town church was built. The ZIP Code is 73097. It was formally a rural town, but it was annexed by Oklahoma City. The town was named after its main crop, wheat.

References

Unincorporated communities in Oklahoma County, Oklahoma
Unincorporated communities in Oklahoma